Valentí Almirall i Llozer (Barcelona, Catalonia, Spain, 8 March 1841 – 1904) was a Catalan politician, considered one of the fathers of modern Catalan nationalism, and more specifically, of the left-wing variety.

Biography

Education
Almirall was a student of the School of Fine Arts in Barcelona but had to leave after criticising the Professor Claudi Lorenzale. In the University of Barcelona, he studied philosophy between 1854 and 1857

Politics
Almirall was originally a federal republican who campaigned for the Catalan Countries to be united to form an administrative entity as a part of a Spanish Federal Republic. He participated in the Glorious Revolution of 1868. His wealth and the little vocation he had as a lawyer pushed him into politics. He participated in the preparation and the facts of the revolution of 1868 in Barcelona, directed the newspaper El Federalista (The Federalist) and collaborated with the Federal-Republican Journal, where he published leaflets quite radical like Guerra a Madrid! (War with Madrid!), Bases para la Constitución federal de la Nación Española y para la del Estado de Cataluña (Basis for the federal Constitution of the Spanish Nation and for the one of the Catalan State), Observaciones sobre el modo de plantear la confederación en España (Observations on the way to propose the confederation in Spain). As a republican he declared himself hostile to any kind of agreement with the monarchic and took part in the Tortosa Pact (18 May 1869), signed by representatives of Republican organizations in Catalonia, Valencia, the Balearic Islands and Aragon.

Between 1868 and 1881 he was a member of the Federal Democratic Republican Party (PRDF). He was the leader of the federal intransigents of Barcelona, a minority group within the federal republicanism, based around the Federalists Club (1868–1869) (of which he was chosen to be the first president) and the newspaper El Estado Catalán (1869–1870 and 1873). Between 1868 and 1869 he guided the publication of El Federalista, characterized by the dogmatism, intransigence, maximalism and idealism of its ideas. This movement wanted to transform the centralized and standardizing Spanish state, into a decentralized federal state through a federal revolution from below, emerged from the initiative of the grassroots classes, a revolution that would involve the federal division of Spanish sovereignty between the Spanish historical regions and the government of the federation.

From 1869 to 1873 he published a newspaper called El Estado Catalan and between 1870 and 1874 he led a cultural organisation called La Jove Catalunya (The young Catalonia). In 1880 he founded El Diari Català (The Catalan newspaper), which was the first daily newspaper to be printed in Catalan language. Soon after he organised the 'Catalanist Congress' which was attended by 1200 people but was criticised by the Renaixença.

In 1881 he abandoned federalism because it was too Spanish in his opinion. In 1882 he founded the Centre Català which tried to bring together all the Catalan cultural and regionalist associations under one umbrella organisation. In 1886 he published 'Lo Catalanisme' which criticised federalism.

The Valentí Almirall square in Barcelona is named after him.

Bibliography
 'Valentí Almirall' by Antoni Rovira i Virgili (1936)

References

External links
 Webpage devoted to Valentí Almirall at LletrA (UOC), Catalan Literature Online), in Catalan.
 

1841 births
1904 deaths
University of Barcelona alumni
Politicians from Barcelona
Lawyers from Barcelona